Thuspeinanta is a genus of plants in the family Lamiaceae, first described in 1888. It is native to central and southwestern Asia.

 Thuspeinanta brahuica (Boiss.) Briq. - Afghanistan, Iran, Baluchistan Province of Pakistan
 Thuspeinanta persica (Boiss.) Briq. - Turkmenistan, Afghanistan, Iran, Syria, Lebanon, Palestine, Saudi Arabia

References

Lamiaceae
Lamiaceae genera
Taxa named by Théophile Alexis Durand